Hugo Tiago Villegas Simões (born 2 May 1986 in Lisbon) is a Portuguese footballer who plays for CD Operário as a left back.

External links

1986 births
Living people
Chilean people of Portuguese descent
Footballers from Lisbon
Portuguese footballers
Association football defenders
Segunda Divisão players
G.D. Tourizense players
FC Pampilhosa players
S.C. Farense players
Sertanense F.C. players
Sport Benfica e Castelo Branco players
First Professional Football League (Bulgaria) players
PFC Lokomotiv Mezdra players
Cypriot Second Division players
Enosis Neon Paralimni FC players
Ayia Napa FC players
PAEEK players
Portuguese expatriate footballers
Expatriate footballers in Bulgaria
Expatriate footballers in Cyprus
Portuguese expatriate sportspeople in Bulgaria
Portuguese expatriate sportspeople in Cyprus